The Korea Baduk Association, also known as Hanguk Kiwon, was founded in November 1945 by Cho Namchul.

Baduk is a game which was present in Korea by the 5th century. It originated in China, but the West is more familiar with the Japanese name Go. This is because the Japanese were the first to introduce it to the West. Japan was introduced to the game in the 7th century AD.

Initially, most Korean players followed the sunjang style of beginning by placing sixteen stones —eight white and eight black— on the board in a preset pattern. Cho Namchul knew that the international players began with an empty board like Japan since Japan was the first to introduce the game to the West. By forming the association, he set about convincing Koreans players to use the "modern" style.

The Hanguk Kiwon is the Go organization that oversees Go professionals in South Korea. It issues official diplomas for strong players and organizes tournaments for professionals.

See also 

 International Go Federation
 List of professional Go tournaments
 American Go Association
 European Go Federation
 Nihon Ki-in (Japanese Go Association)
 Taiwan Chi-Yuan (Taiwanese Go Association)
 Chinese Weiqi Association (Chinese Go Association)

References

External links 
 Official Website of Korea Baduk Association
 History of the Hanguk Kiwon as remembered by its founder, Cho Namchul
 Map of the location of Hanguk Kiwon in Seoul - Address: 315 Honik-Dong Seongdong-Gu.

Go organizations
Go in South Korea
1945 establishments in Korea
Sports organizations established in 1945